Vietnamese is an Austroasiatic language originating from Northern Vietnam where it is the national and official language. Vietnamese is spoken natively by over 70 million people, several times as many as the rest of the Austroasiatic family combined. It is the native language of the Vietnamese (Kinh) people, as well as a second language or first language for other ethnic groups in Vietnam. As a result of emigration, Vietnamese speakers are also found in other parts of Southeast Asia, East Asia, North America, Europe, and Australia. Vietnamese has also been officially recognized as a minority language in the Czech Republic.

Like many other languages in Southeast Asia and East Asia, Vietnamese is an analytic language with phonemic tone. It has head-initial directionality, with subject–verb–object order and modifiers following the words they modify. It also uses noun classifiers. Its vocabulary has had significant influence from Chinese and French.

Vietnamese was historically written using , a logographic script using Chinese characters to represent Sino-Vietnamese vocabulary and some native Vietnamese words, together with many locally invented characters to represent other words. French colonial rule of Vietnam led to the official adoption of the Vietnamese alphabet which is based on Latin script. It uses digraphs and diacritics to mark tones and some phonemes.

Classification
Early linguistic work some 150 years ago (Logan 1852 and Schmidt 1905) classified Vietnamese as belonging to the Mon–Khmer branch of the Austroasiatic language family (which also includes the Khmer language spoken in Cambodia, as well as various smaller and/or regional languages, such as the Munda and Khasi languages spoken in eastern India, and others in Laos, southern China and parts of Thailand). Later, Mường was found to be more closely related to Vietnamese than other Mon–Khmer languages, and a Viet–Muong subgrouping was established, also including Thavung, Chut, Cuoi, etc. The term "Vietic" was proposed by Hayes (1992), who proposed to redefine Viet–Muong as referring to a subbranch of Vietic containing only Vietnamese and Mường. The term "Vietic" is used, among others, by Gérard Diffloth, with a slightly different proposal on subclassification, within which the term "Viet–Muong" refers to a lower subgrouping (within an eastern Vietic branch) consisting of Vietnamese dialects, Mường dialects, and Nguồn (of Quảng Bình Province).

History
Vietnamese belongs to the Northern (Viet–Muong) clusters of the Vietic branch, spoken by the Vietic peoples. The language was first recorded in the Tháp Miếu Temple Inscription, dating from early 13th century AD. The inscription was carved on a stone stele, in combined Chữ Hán and archaic form of the Chữ Nôm.

In the distant past, Vietnamese shared more characteristics common to other languages in South East Asia and with the Austroasiatic family, such as an inflectional morphology and a richer set of consonant clusters, which have subsequently disappeared from the language under Chinese influence. Vietnamese is heavily influenced by its location in the Mainland Southeast Asia linguistic area, with the result that it has acquired or converged toward characteristics such as isolating morphology and phonemically distinctive tones, through processes of tonogenesis. These characteristics have become part of many of the genetically unrelated languages of Southeast Asia; for example, Tsat (a member of the Malayo-Polynesian group within Austronesian), and Vietnamese each developed tones as a phonemic feature. The ancestor of the Vietnamese language is usually believed to have been originally based in the area of the Red River Delta in what is now northern Vietnam.

Distinctive tonal variations emerged during the subsequent expansion of the Vietnamese language and people from the Red River Plain into what is now central and southern Vietnam through conquest of the ancient nation of Champa and the Khmer people of the Mekong Delta in the vicinity of present-day Ho Chi Minh City, also known as Saigon.

Northern Vietnam was primarily influenced by Chinese, which came to predominate politically in the 2nd century BC. After the emergence of the Ngô dynasty at the beginning of the 10th century, the ruling class adopted Classical Chinese as the formal medium of government, scholarship and literature. With the dominance of Chinese came radical importation of Chinese vocabulary and grammatical influence. The resulting Sino-Vietnamese vocabulary makes up about a third of the Vietnamese lexicon in all realms, and may account for as much as 60% of the vocabulary used in formal texts.

After France invaded Vietnam in the late 19th century, French gradually replaced Chinese as the official language in education and government.

Henri Maspero described six periods of the Vietnamese language:
Proto-Viet–Muong, also known as Pre-Vietnamese, the ancestor of Vietnamese and the related Mường language (before 7th century AD).
Proto-Vietnamese, the oldest reconstructable version of Vietnamese, dated to just before the entry of massive amounts of Sino-Vietnamese vocabulary into the language, c. 7th to 9th century AD. At this state, the language had three tones.
Archaic Vietnamese, the state of the language upon adoption of the Sino-Vietnamese vocabulary and the beginning of creation of the Vietnamese characters (chữ Nôm) during the Ngô Dynasty, c. 10th century AD.
Ancient Vietnamese, the language represented by Chữ Nôm (c. 15th century), widely used during the Lê dynasty. The Ming glossary "Annanguo Yiyu" 安南國譯語 (c. 15th century) by the Bureau of Interpreters 会同馆 (from the series Huáyí Yìyǔ recorded the language at this point of history. By this point, a tone split had happened in the language, leading to six tones but a loss of contrastive voicing among consonants.
Middle Vietnamese, the language found in Dictionarium Annamiticum Lusitanum et Latinum of the Jesuit missionary Alexandre de Rhodes (c. 17th century); the dictionary was published in Rome in 1651. Another famous dictionary of this period was written by P. J. Pigneau de Behaine in 1773 and published by Jean-Louis Taberd in 1838.
Modern Vietnamese, from the 19th century.

Proto–Viet–Muong
The following diagram shows the phonology of Proto–Viet–Muong (the nearest ancestor of Vietnamese and the closely related Mường language), along with the outcomes in the modern language:

{| class="wikitable"
|-
! colspan="2" |
! Labial
! colspan="2" | Dental/Alveolar
! Palatal
! Velar
! Glottal
|-
! colspan="2" |Nasal
|* > m
|* > n
|
|* > nh
|* > ng/ngh
|
|-
! rowspan="4" | Stop
| style="background: #efefef;" | tenuis
| * > b
| * > đ
|
| * > ch
| * > k/c/q
| * > #
|-
| style="background: #efefef;" | voiced
| * > b
| * > đ
|
| * > ch
| * > k/c/q
|
|-
| style="background: #efefef;" | aspirated
| * > ph
| * > th
|
|
| * > kh
|
|-
| style="background: #efefef;" | implosive
| * > m
| * > n
|
| * > nh 
|
|
|-
! colspan="2" | Affricate
|
|
|
| * > x 
|
|
|-
! rowspan="2" | Fricative
| style="background: #efefef;" | voiceless
|
|
| * > t
|
|
| * > h
|-
| style="background: #efefef;" | voiced 
| * > v 
| * > d
| * > r 
| * > gi
| * > g/gh
|
|-
! colspan="2" | Approximant
| * > v
| * > l
| * > r
| * > d
|
|
|}

 According to Ferlus, * and * are not accepted by all researchers. Ferlus 1992 also had additional phonemes * and *.

 The fricatives indicated above in parentheses developed as allophones of stop consonants occurring between vowels (i.e. when a minor syllable occurred). These fricatives were not present in Proto-Viet–Muong, as indicated by their absence in Mường, but were evidently present in the later Proto-Vietnamese stage. Subsequent loss of the minor-syllable prefixes phonemicized the fricatives. Ferlus 1992 proposes that originally there were both voiced and voiceless fricatives, corresponding to original voiced or voiceless stops, but Ferlus 2009 appears to have abandoned that hypothesis, suggesting that stops were softened and voiced at approximately the same time, according to the following pattern:
 > 
 > 
 > 
 > 
 > 

 In Middle Vietnamese, the outcome of these sounds was written with a hooked b (ꞗ), representing a  that was still distinct from v (then pronounced ). See below.

 It is unclear what this sound was. According to Ferlus 1992, in the Archaic Vietnamese period (c. 10th century AD, when Sino-Vietnamese vocabulary was borrowed) it was *, distinct at that time from *.

The following initial clusters occurred, with outcomes indicated:
 *pr, *br, *tr, *dr, *kr, *gr >  >  > s
 *pl, *bl > MV bl > Northern gi, Southern tr
 *kl, *gl > MV tl > tr
 *ml > MV ml > mnh > nh
 *kj > gi

A large number of words were borrowed from Middle Chinese, forming part of the Sino-Vietnamese vocabulary.

Origin of tones

Proto-Viet–Muong had no tones to speak of. The tones later developed in some of the daughter languages from distinctions in the initial and final consonants. Vietnamese tones developed as follows:

{| class="wikitable" style="text-align:center;"
|-
! Register
! Initial consonant
! Smooth ending
! Glottal ending
! Fricative ending
|-
! High (first) register
| Voiceless
| A1 ngang "level"
| B1 sắc "sharp"
| C1 hỏi "asking"
|-
! Low (second) register
| Voiced
| A2 huyền "deep"
| B2 nặng "heavy"
| C2 ngã "tumbling"
|}

Both types of syllables could co-occur with a resonant (e.g.  or ).

At some point, a tone split occurred, as in many other mainland Southeast Asian languages. Essentially, an allophonic distinction developed in the tones, whereby the tones in syllables with voiced initials were pronounced differently from those with voiceless initials. (Approximately speaking, the voiced allotones were pronounced with additional breathy voice or creaky voice and with lowered pitch. The quality difference predominates in today's northern varieties, e.g. in Hanoi, while in the southern varieties the pitch difference predominates, as in Ho Chi Minh City.) Subsequent to this, the plain-voiced stops became voiceless and the allotones became new phonemic tones. Note that the implosive stops were unaffected, and in fact developed tonally as if they were unvoiced. (This behavior is common to all East Asian languages with implosive stops.)

As noted above, Proto-Viet–Muong had sesquisyllabic words with an initial minor syllable (in addition to, and independent of, initial clusters in the main syllable). When a minor syllable occurred, the main syllable's initial consonant was intervocalic and as a result suffered lenition, becoming a voiced fricative. The minor syllables were eventually lost, but not until the tone split had occurred. As a result, words in modern Vietnamese with voiced fricatives occur in all six tones, and the tonal register reflects the voicing of the minor-syllable prefix and not the voicing of the main-syllable stop in Proto-Viet–Muong that produced the fricative. (Thompson 1976 reconstructed voiceless resonants to account for outcomes where resonants occur with a first-register tone, but this is no longer considered necessary, at least by Ferlus.)

Old Vietnamese
{| class="wikitable" style=text-align:center
|+ Old Vietnamese Phonology
|-
! colspan="2" |
! Labial
! Alveolar
! Palatal
! Velar
! Glottal
|-
! colspan="2" | Nasal
| m
| n
| nh
| ng/ngh
| 
|-
! rowspan="3" | Stop
| style="background: #f2f2f2;" | tenuis
| b/v
| d/đ
| ch/gi
| c/k/q
| #
|-
| style="background: #f2f2f2;" | aspirated
| ph
| th
| t/r
| kh
| h
|-
| style="background: #f2f2f2;" | Implosive stop
| m
| n
| nh
|
|
|-
! rowspan="1" | Fricative
| style="background: #f2f2f2;" | voiced
| v
| 
| d
| 
|
|-
! colspan="2" | Affricate
| 
| 
| x
| 
|
|-
! colspan="2" | Liquid
| r 
| l 
| 
|
|
|}

Old Vietnamese/Ancient Vietnamese was a Vietic language which was separated from Viet–Muong around 9th century, and evolved to Middle Vietnamese by 16th century. The sources for the reconstruction of Old Vietnamese are Nom texts, such as the 12th-century/1486 Buddhist scripture Phật thuyết Đại báo phụ mẫu ân trọng kinh ("Sūtra explained by the Buddha on the Great Repayment of the Heavy Debt to Parents"), old inscriptions, and late 13th-century (possibly 1293) Annan Jishi glossary by Chinese diplomat Chen Fu (c. 1259 – 1309). Old Vietnamese used Chinese characters phonetically where each word, monosyllabic in Modern Vietnamese, is written with two Chinese characters or in a composite character made of two different characters. It conveys the transformation of Vietnamese lexicons from sesquisyllabic to fully monosyllabic through monosyllabization process under pressures of Chinese linguistic influence, characterized by phenomena such as the reduction of minor syllables; loss of affixal morphology drifting towards analytical grammar; simplification of major syllable segments, and change of suprasegment instruments.

For examples, the modern Vietnamese word "trời" (heaven) was read as *plời in Old/Ancient Vietnamese and as blời in Middle Vietnamese.

Middle Vietnamese
The writing system used for Vietnamese is based closely on the system developed by Alexandre de Rhodes for his 1651 Dictionarium Annamiticum Lusitanum et Latinum. It reflects the pronunciation of the Vietnamese of Hanoi at that time, a stage commonly termed Middle Vietnamese. The pronunciation of the "rime" of the syllable, i.e. all parts other than the initial consonant (optional  glide, vowel nucleus, tone and final consonant), appears nearly identical between Middle Vietnamese and modern Hanoi pronunciation. On the other hand, the Middle Vietnamese pronunciation of the initial consonant differs greatly from all modern dialects, and in fact is significantly closer to the modern Saigon dialect than the modern Hanoi dialect.

The following diagram shows the orthography and pronunciation of Middle Vietnamese:

{| class="wikitable" style=text-align:center
|-
! colspan="2" |
! Labial
! Dental/Alveolar
! Retroflex
! Palatal
! Velar
! Glottal
|-
! colspan="2" | Nasal
| m 
| n 
|
| nh 
| ng/ngh 
|
|-
! rowspan="3" | Stop
| style="background: #f2f2f2;" | tenuis
| p 
| t 
| tr 
| ch 
| c/k 
|
|-
| style="background: #f2f2f2;" | aspirated
| ph 
| th 
|
|
| kh 
|
|-
| style="background: #f2f2f2;" | implosive
| b 
| đ 
|
|
|
|
|-
! rowspan="2" | Fricative
| style="background: #f2f2f2;" | voiceless
|
|
| s/ſ 
| x 
|
| h 
|-
| style="background: #f2f2f2;" | voiced
| ꞗ 
| d 
|
| gi 
| g/gh 
|
|-
! colspan="2" | Approximant
| v/u/o 
| l 
|
| y/i/ĕ 
|
|
|-
! colspan="2" | Rhotic
|
| colspan="2" | r 
|
|
|
|}

  occurs only at the end of a syllable.
 This symbol, "Latin small letter B with flourish", looks like: . It has a rounded hook that starts halfway up the left side (where the top of the curved part of the b meets the vertical, straight part) and curves about 180 degrees counterclockwise, ending below the bottom-left corner.
This ĕ, and the  it notated, have disappeared from the modern language.

Note that b  and p  never contrast in any position, suggesting that they are allophones.

The language also has three clusters at the beginning of syllables, which have since disappeared:

tl  > modern tr
bl  > modern gi (Northern), tr (Southern)
ml  > mnh  > modern nh

Most of the unusual correspondences between spelling and modern pronunciation are explained by Middle Vietnamese. Note in particular:
de Rhodes' system has two different b letters, a regular b and a "hooked" b in which the upper section of the curved part of the b extends leftward past the vertical bar and curls down again in a semicircle. This apparently represented a voiced bilabial fricative .
de Rhodes' system has a second medial glide  that is written ĕ and appears in some words with initial d and hooked b. These later disappear.
đ  was (and still is) alveolar, whereas d  was dental. The inconsistency with the symbols assigned to  vs.  was based on the lack of any such place distinction between the two, with the result that the stop consonant  appeared more "normal" than the fricative . In both cases, the implosive nature of the stops does not appear to have had any role in the choice of symbol.
x was the alveolo-palatal fricative  rather than the dental  of the modern language. In 17th-century Portuguese, the common language of the Jesuits, s was the apico-alveolar sibilant  (as still in much of Spain and some parts of Portugal), while x was a palatoalveolar . The similarity of apicoalveolar  to the Vietnamese retroflex  led to the assignment of s and x as above.

De Rhodes's orthography also made use of an apex diacritic, as in o᷄ and u᷄, to indicate a final labial-velar nasal , an allophone of  that is peculiar to the Hanoi dialect to the present day. This diacritic is often mistaken for a tilde in modern reproductions of early Vietnamese writing.

Geographic distribution

As the national language, Vietnamese is the lingua franca in Vietnam. It is also spoken by the Jing people traditionally residing on three islands (now joined to the mainland) off Dongxing in southern Guangxi Province, China. A large number of Vietnamese speakers also reside in neighboring countries of Cambodia and Laos.

In the United States, Vietnamese is the sixth most spoken language, with over 1.5 million speakers, who are concentrated in a handful of states. It is the third-most spoken language in Texas and Washington; fourth-most in Georgia, Louisiana, and Virginia; and fifth-most in Arkansas and California. Vietnamese is the fourth most spoken language in Australia, after Arabic, Mandarin and English. In France, it is the most spoken Asian language and the eighth most spoken immigrant language at home.

Official status
Vietnamese is the sole official and national language of Vietnam. It is the first language of the majority of the Vietnamese population, as well as a first or second language for the country's ethnic minority groups.

In the Czech Republic, Vietnamese has been recognized as one of 14 minority languages, on the basis of communities that have resided in the country either traditionally or on a long-term basis. This status grants the Vietnamese community in the country a representative on the Government Council for Nationalities, an advisory body of the Czech Government for matters of policy towards national minorities and their members. It also grants the community the right to use Vietnamese with public authorities and in courts anywhere in the country.

As a foreign language
Vietnamese is increasingly being taught in schools and institutions outside of Vietnam, a large part which is contributed by its large diaspora. In countries with strongly established Vietnamese-speaking communities such as the United States, France, Australia, Canada, Germany, and the Czech Republic, Vietnamese language education largely serves as a cultural role to link descendants of Vietnamese immigrants to their ancestral culture. Meanwhile, in countries near Vietnam such as Cambodia, Laos, and Thailand, the increased role of Vietnamese in foreign language education is largely due to the recent recovery of the Vietnamese economy.

Since the 1980s, Vietnamese language schools have been established for youth in many Vietnamese-speaking communities around the world, notably in the United States.

Similarly, since the late 1980s, the Vietnamese-German community has enlisted the support of city governments to bring Vietnamese into high school curriculum for the purpose of teaching and reminding Vietnamese German students of their mother-tongue. Furthermore, there has also been a number of Germans studying Vietnamese due to increased economic investments and business.

Historic and stronger trade and diplomatic relations with Vietnam and a growing interest among the French Vietnamese population (one of France's most established non-European ethnic groups) of their ancestral culture have also led to an increasing number of institutions in France, including universities, to offer formal courses in the language.

Phonology

Vowels
Vietnamese has a large number of vowels. Below is a vowel diagram of Vietnamese from Hanoi (including centering diphthongs):

{| class="wikitable" style="text-align: center;"
|-
!  
! Front
! Central
! Back
|-
! Centering
| ia/iê 
| ưa/ươ 
| ua/uô 
|-
! Close
| i/y 
| ư 
| u 
|-
! Close-mid/Mid
| ê 
| ơ â  
| ô 
|-
! Open-mid/Open
|e 
| a ă 
| o 
|}

Front and central vowels (i, ê, e, ư, â, ơ, ă, a) are unrounded, whereas the back vowels (u, ô, o) are rounded. The vowels â  and ă  are pronounced very short, much shorter than the other vowels.

The centering diphthongs are formed with only the three high vowels (i, ư, u). They are generally spelled as ia, ưa, ua when they end a word and are spelled iê, ươ, uô, respectively, when they are followed by a consonant.

In addition to single vowels (or monophthongs) and centering diphthongs, Vietnamese has closing diphthongs and triphthongs. There are restrictions on the high offglides:  cannot occur after a front vowel (i, ê, e) nucleus and  cannot occur after a back vowel (u, ô, o) nucleus.

{| class="wikitable" style="text-align: center;"
|-
! rowspan="2"| 
! colspan="2"|  offglide
! colspan="2"|  offglide
|-
! Front
! colspan="2"| Central
! Back
|-
! Centering
| iêu 
| ươu 
| ươi 
| uôi 
|-
! Close
| iu 
| ưu 
| ưi 
| ui 
|-
! Close-mid/Mid
| êu 
| –âu
| ơi ây 
| ôi 
|-
! Open-mid/Open
| eo 
| ao au 
| ai ay 
| oi 
|}

The correspondence between the orthography and pronunciation is complicated. For example, the offglide  is usually written as i; however, it may also be represented with y. In addition, in the diphthongs  and  the letters y and i also indicate the pronunciation of the main vowel: ay = ă + , ai = a + . Similarly, u and o indicate different pronunciations of the main vowel: au = ă + , ao = a + .

Consonants
The consonants that occur in Vietnamese are listed below in the Vietnamese orthography with the phonetic pronunciation to the right.

{| class=wikitable style=text-align:center
|-
! colspan=2|
! Labial
! Dental/Alveolar
! Retroflex
! Palatal
! Velar
! Glottal
|-
! colspan=2| Nasal
| m 
| n 
|
| nh 
| ng/ngh 
|
|-
! rowspan=3| Stop
! tenuis
| p 
| t 
| tr 
| ch 
| c/k/q 
|
|-
! aspirated
|
| th 
|
|
|
|
|-
! implosive
| b 
| đ 
|
|
|
|
|-
! rowspan=2| Fricative
! voiceless
| ph 
| x 
| s 
|
| kh 
| h 
|-
! voiced
| v 
| d/gi 
|
|
| g/gh 
|
|-
! colspan=2| Approximant
|
| l 
|
| y/i 
| u/o 
|
|-
! colspan=2| Rhotic
|
| colspan=2| r 
|
|
|
|}

Some consonant sounds are written with only one letter (like "p"), other consonant sounds are written with a digraph (like "ph"), and others are written with more than one letter or digraph (the velar stop is written variously as "c", "k", or "q"). In some cases, they are based on their Middle Vietnamese pronunciation; since that period, ph and kh (but not th) have evolved from aspirated stops into fricatives (like Greek phi and chi), while d and gi have collapsed and converged together (into /z/ in the north and /j/ in the south).

Not all dialects of Vietnamese have the same consonant in a given word (although all dialects use the same spelling in the written language). See the language variation section for further elaboration.

Syllable-final orthographic ch and nh in Vietnamese has had different analyses. One analysis has final ch, nh as being phonemes  contrasting with syllable-final t, c  and n, ng  and identifies final ch with the syllable-initial ch . The other analysis has final ch and nh as predictable allophonic variants of the velar phonemes  and  that occur after the upper front vowels i  and ê ; although they also occur after a, but in such cases are believed to have resulted from an earlier e  which diphthongized to ai (cf. ach from aic, anh from aing). (See Vietnamese phonology: Analysis of final ch, nh for further details.)

Tones

Each Vietnamese syllable is pronounced with one of six inherent tones, centered on the main vowel or group of vowels. Tones differ in:
 length (duration)
 pitch contour (i.e. pitch melody)
 pitch height
 phonation

Tone is indicated by diacritics written above or below the vowel (most of the tone diacritics appear above the vowel; however, the nặng tone dot diacritic goes below the vowel). The six tones in the northern varieties (including Hanoi), with their self-referential Vietnamese names, are:

Other dialects of Vietnamese may have fewer tones (typically only five).

In Vietnamese poetry, tones are classed into two groups: (tone pattern)

Words with tones belonging to a particular tone group must occur in certain positions within the poetic verse.

Vietnamese Catholics practice a distinctive style of prayer recitation called , in which each tone is assigned a specific note or sequence of notes.

Grammar

Vietnamese, like Chinese and many languages in Southeast Asia, is an analytic language. Vietnamese does not use morphological marking of case, gender, number or tense (and, as a result, has no finite/nonfinite distinction). Also like other languages in the region, Vietnamese syntax conforms to subject–verb–object word order, is head-initial (displaying modified-modifier ordering), and has a noun classifier system. Additionally, it is pro-drop, wh-in-situ, and allows verb serialization.

Some Vietnamese sentences with English word glosses and translations are provided below.

Lexicon

Austroasiatic origins
Many early studies brainstormed Vietnamese language-origins to have been either Tai, Sino-Tibetan or Austroasiatic. Austroasiatic origins are so far the most tenable to date, with some of the oldest words in Vietnamese being Austroasiatic in origin.

Ancient Chinese contact

Although Vietnamese roots are classified as Austroasiatic, Vietic and Viet-Muong, the result of language contact with Chinese heavily influenced the Vietnamese language, causing it to diverge from Viet-Muong into Vietnamese, which was seen to have split Vietnamese from Muong around the 10th to 11th century. For instance, the Vietnamese word quản lý, meaning management (noun) or manage (verb) is likely descended from the same word as guǎnlǐ in Chinese, kanri in Japanese, and gwanli in Korean. Instances of Chinese contact include the historical Nam Việt (aka Nanyue) as well as other periods of influences. Besides English and French which have made some contributions to Vietnamese language, Japanese loanwords into Vietnamese are also a more recently studied phenomenon.

Modern linguists describe modern Vietnamese having lost many Proto-Austroasiatic phonological and morphological features that original Vietnamese had. The Chinese influence on Vietnamese corresponds to various periods when Vietnam was under Chinese rule, and subsequent influence after Vietnam became independent. Early linguists thought that this meant Vietnamese lexicon then received only two layers of Chinese words, one stemming from the period under actual Chinese rule and a second layer from afterwards. These words are grouped together as Sino-Vietnamese vocabulary.

However, according to linguist John Phan, “Annamese Middle Chinese” was already used and spoken in the Red River Valley by the 1st century CE, and its vocabulary significantly fused with the co-existing Proto-Viet-Muong language, the immediate ancestor of Vietnamese. He lists three major classes of Sino-Vietnamese borrowings: Early Sino-Vietnamese (Han Dynasty (ca. 1st century CE) and Jin Dynasty (ca. 4th century CE), Late Sino-Vietnamese (Tang Dynasty), Recent Sino-Vietnamese (Ming Dynasty and afterwards)

French colonial era 
Additionally, the French presence in Vietnam from 1777 to the Geneva Accords of 1954 resulted in significant influence from French into the Indochina region (Laos, Cambodia and Vietnam). "Cà phê" in Vietnamese was derived from the French café (coffee). Yogurt in Vietnamese is "sữa chua" (lit. "sour milk"), but also calqued from French (yaourt) into Vietnamese (da ua - /j/a ua). "Phô mai" (cheese) is also derived from the French fromage. Musical note was borrowed into Vietnamese as "nốt" or "nốt nhạc", from the French note de musique. The Vietnamese term for steering wheel is "vô lăng", a partial derivation from the French volant directionnel. The necktie (cravate in French) is rendered into Vietnamese as "cà vạt".

In addition, modern Vietnamese pronunciations of French names remain directly derived from the original French pronunciation ("Pa-ri" for Paris, "Mác-xây" for Marseille, "Boóc-đô" for Bordeaux, etc.), whereas pronunciations of other foreign names (Chinese excluded) are generally derived from English pronunciations.

English 
Some English words were incorporated into Vietnamese as loan words, such as "TV" borrowed as "tivi" or just TV, but still officially called truyền hình. Some other borrowings are calques, translated into Vietnamese, for example, 'software' is translated into "phần mềm" (literally meaning "soft part"). Words like "peptide", may be seen as peptit.

Japanese 
Japanese loanwords are a more recently studied phenomenon, with a paper by Nguyễn & Lê (2020) classifying three layers of Japanese loanwords, where the third layer was used by Vietnamese who studied Japanese and the first two layers being the main layers of borrowings that were derived from Japanese. The first layer consisted of Kanji words created by Japanese to represent Western concepts that were not readily available in Chinese or Japanese, where by the end of the 19th century they were imported to other Asian languages. This first layer was called Sino-Vietnamese words of Japanese-origins. For example, the Vietnamese term for "association club", câu lạc bộ, which was borrowed from Chinese (pinyin: jùlèbù; jyutping: keoi1 lok6 bou6), which was borrowed from Japanese (rōmaji: kurabu) which came from English ("club"), resulting in indirect borrowing from Japanese.

The second layer was from brief Japanese occupation of Vietnam from 1940 until 1945. However, Japanese cultural influence in Vietnam started significantly from the 1980s. This new, second layer of Japan-origin loanwords is distinctive from Sino-Vietnamese words of Japanese-origin in that they were borrowed directly from Japanese. This vocabulary included words representative of Japanese culture, such as kimono, sumo, samurai, and bonsai from modified Hepburn romanisation. These loanwords are coined as "new Japanese loanwords". A significant number of new Japanese loanwords were also of Chinese origin. Sometimes, the same concept can be described using both Sino-Vietnamese words of Japanese origin (first layer) and new Japanese loanwords (second layer). For example, judo can be referred to as both judo and nhu đạo, the Vietnamese reading of 柔道.

Modern Chinese influence 
Some words such as lạp xưởng from 臘腸 (Chinese sausage) primarily keeps to the Cantonese pronunciation, brought over from southern Chinese migrants, whereas in Hán-Việt, which has been described as being close to Middle Chinese pronunciation, is it actually pronounced lạp trường. However, the Cantonese term is the more well known name for Chinese sausage in Vietnam. Meanwhile, any new terms calqued from Chinese would be from Mandarin into Sino-Vietnamese pronunciation. Additionally, in southern provinces of Vietnam, the name xí ngầu can be used to refer to dice, which may have derived from a Cantonese or Teochew idiom "xập xí, xập ngầu" (十四, 十五, Sino-Vietnamese: thập tứ, thập ngũ) meaning "fourteen, fifteen" meaning 'uncertain'.

Pure Vietnamese words 
Basic vocabulary in Vietnamese are of Proto-Vietic origins, these words are considered as pure Vietnamese words rather than loanwords. Vietnamese shares a large amount of vocabulary with the Mường languages, a close relative of the Vietnamese language.

Other compound words, like nước non (chữ Nôm: 渃𡽫) meaning figuratively country; nation (literally meaning, water and mountains) seem to be purely Vietnamese inventions, which used to be inscribed in chữ Nôm characters, which were compounded self-coined Chinese characters, which are now written in the Vietnamese alphabet.

Slang 
Vietnamese slang (tiếng lóng) has changed over time. Vietnamese slang consists of pure Vietnamese words as well as words borrowed from other languages such as Mandarin or Indo-European languages. It is estimated that Vietnamese slang that originated from Mandarin accounts for a tiny proportion of all Vietnamese slang (4.6% of surveyed data in newspapers). On the other hand, slang that originated from Indo-European languages accounts for a more significant proportion (12%) and is much more common in today's uses. Slang borrowed from these languages can be either transliteration or vernacular. Some examples:

With the rise of the Internet, new slang is generated and popularized through social media. This more modern slang is commonly used among the younger generation in Vietnam. This more recent slang is mostly pure Vietnamese, and almost all the words are homonyms or some form of wordplay. Some examples include:

There are debates on the prevalence of uses of slang among young people in Vietnam, as specific teen speak conversations become difficult to understand for older generations. Many critics believed that incorporating teen-speak or internet slang into a daily conversation among teenagers would affect the formality and cadence of speech. Others argue that it is not the slang that is the problem but rather the lack of communication techniques for the instant internet messaging era. They believe slang should not be dismissed, but instead, youth should be informed enough to know when to use them and when it is appropriate. Quê, a word in Vietnamese, in English means "hometown", but it's a slang people use to make others feel embarrassed or guilty

Writing systems

Up to the late 19th century (except for two brief interludes), all formal writing, including government business, scholarship and formal literature, was done in Literary Chinese, written with Chinese characters. Although the writing system is now mostly in chữ quốc ngữ (Latin script), Chinese script known as chữ Hán in Vietnamese as well as Chữ Nôm (together, Hán-Nôm) is still present in such activities such as Vietnamese calligraphy.

Chữ Nôm 

From around the 13th century, Vietnamese scholars used their knowledge of the Chinese script to develop the  script to record folk literature in Vietnamese. The script used Chinese characters to represent both borrowed Sino-Vietnamese vocabulary and native words with similar pronunciation or meaning. In addition, thousands of new compound characters were created to write Vietnamese words using a variety of methods, including phono-semantic compounds.
For example, in the opening lines of the classic poem The Tale of Kiều,
 the Sino-Vietnamese word  'destiny' was written with its original character ;
 the native Vietnamese word  'our' was written with the character  of the homophonous Sino-Vietnamese word  'little, few; rather, somewhat';
However, it was only used for official purposes during the brief Hồ and Tây Sơn dynasties (1400–1406 and 1778–1802 respectively).

A Vietnamese Catholic, Nguyễn Trường Tộ, unsuccessfully petitioned the Court suggesting the adoption of a script for Vietnamese based on Chinese characters.

Vietnamese alphabet 

A romanisation of Vietnamese was codified in the 17th century by the Avignonese Jesuit missionary Alexandre de Rhodes (1591–1660), based on works of earlier Portuguese missionaries, particularly Francisco de Pina, Gaspar do Amaral and Antonio Barbosa. Still,  was the dominant script in Vietnamese Catholic literature for more than 200 years. Starting from the late 19th century, the Vietnamese alphabet ( or "national language script") was gradually expanded from its initial usage in Christian writing to become more popular among the general public.

The Vietnamese alphabet contains 29 letters, including one digraph (đ) and nine with diacritics, five of which are used to designate tone (i.e. à, á, ả, ã, and ạ) and the other four used for separate letters of the Vietnamese alphabet (ă, â/ê/ô, ơ, ư).

This romanised script became predominant over the course of the early 20th century, when education became widespread and a simpler writing system was found to be more expedient for teaching and communication with the general population. The French colonial administration sought to eliminate Chinese writing, Confucianism, and other Chinese influences from Vietnam. French superseded Chinese in administration. Vietnamese written with the alphabet became required for all public documents in 1910 by issue of a decree by the French Résident Supérieur of the protectorate of Tonkin.

Nevertheless,  was still in use during the French colonial period and as late as World War II was still featured on banknotes, but fell out of official and mainstream use shortly thereafter. Today, only a few scholars and some extremely elderly people are able to read  or use it in Vietnamese calligraphy.

 reflects a "Middle Vietnamese" dialect that combines vowels and final consonants most similar to northern dialects with initial consonants most similar to southern dialects. This Middle Vietnamese is presumably close to the Hanoi variety as spoken sometime after 1600 but before the present. (This is not unlike how English orthography is based on the Chancery Standard of Late Middle English, with many spellings retained even after the Great Vowel Shift.)

Computer support

The Unicode character set contains all Vietnamese characters and the Vietnamese currency symbol. On systems that do not support Unicode, many 8-bit Vietnamese code pages are available such as Vietnamese Standard Code for Information Interchange (VSCII) or Windows-1258. Where ASCII must be used, Vietnamese letters are often typed using the VIQR convention, though this is largely unnecessary with the increasing ubiquity of Unicode. There are many software tools that help type Roman-script Vietnamese on English keyboards, such as WinVNKey and Unikey on Windows, or MacVNKey on Macintosh, with popular methods of encoding Vietnamese using Telex, VNI or VIQR input methods all included. Telex input method is often set as the default for many devices. Besides third-party software tools, operating systems such as Windows or macOS can also be installed with Vietnamese and Vietnamese keyboard, e.g. Vietnamese Telex in Microsoft Windows.

Dates and numbers writing formats
Vietnamese speak date in the format "day month year". Each month's name is just the ordinal of that month appended after the word tháng, which means "month". Traditional Vietnamese, however, assigns other names to some months; these names are mostly used in the lunar calendar and in poetry.

When written in the short form, "DD/MM/YYYY" is preferred.

Example:
English: 28 March 2018
Vietnamese long form: Ngày 28 tháng 3 năm 2018
Vietnamese short form: 28/3/2018

The Vietnamese prefer writing numbers with a comma as the decimal separator in lieu of dots, and either spaces or dots to group the digits. An example is 1 629,15 (one thousand six hundred twenty-nine point fifteen). Because a comma is used as the decimal separator, a semicolon is used to separate two numbers instead.

Literature
 
The Tale of Kiều is an epic narrative poem by the celebrated poet Nguyễn Du,, which is often considered the most significant work of Vietnamese literature. It was originally written in Chữ Nôm (titled  ) and is widely taught in Vietnam (in chữ Quốc Ngữ transliteration).

Language variation

The Vietnamese language has several mutually intelligible regional varieties:

Vietnamese has traditionally been divided into three dialect regions: North, Central, and South. Michel Ferlus and Nguyễn Tài Cẩn found that there was a separate North-Central dialect for Vietnamese as well. The term Haut-Annam refers to dialects spoken from the northern Nghệ An Province to the southern (former) Thừa Thiên Province that preserve archaic features (like consonant clusters and undiphthongized vowels) that have been lost in other modern dialects.

The dialect regions differ mostly in their sound systems (see below) but also in vocabulary (including basic and non-basic vocabulary) and grammar. The North-Central and the Central regional varieties, which have a significant number of vocabulary differences, are generally less mutually intelligible to Northern and Southern speakers. There is less internal variation within the Southern region than the other regions because of its relatively late settlement by Vietnamese-speakers (around the end of the 15th century). The North-Central region is particularly conservative since its pronunciation has diverged less from Vietnamese orthography than the other varieties, which tend to merge certain sounds. Along the coastal areas, regional variation has been neutralized to a certain extent, but more mountainous regions preserve more variation. As for sociolinguistic attitudes, the North-Central varieties are often felt to be "peculiar" or "difficult to understand" by speakers of other dialects although their pronunciation fits the written language the most closely; that is typically because of various words in their vocabulary that are unfamiliar to other speakers (see the example vocabulary table below).

The large movements of people between North and South since the mid-20th century has resulted in a sizable number of Southern residents speaking in the Northern accent/dialect and, to a greater extent, Northern residents speaking in the Southern accent/dialect. After the Geneva Accords of 1954, which called for the temporary division of the country, about a million northerners (mainly from Hanoi, Haiphong, and the surrounding Red River Delta areas) moved south (mainly to Saigon and heavily to Biên Hòa and Vũng Tàu and the surrounding areas) as part of Operation Passage to Freedom. About 180,000 moved in the reverse direction (Tập kết ra Bắc, literally "go to the North".)

After the Fall of Saigon in 1975, Northern and North-Central speakers from the densely-populated Red River Delta and the traditionally-poorer provinces of Nghệ An, Hà Tĩnh, and Quảng Bình have continued to move south to look for better economic opportunities since the new government's New Economic Zones, a program that lasted from 1975 to 1985. The first half of the program (1975–1980) resulted in 1.3 million people sent to the New Economic Zones (NEZs), most of which were relocated to the southern half of the country in previously-uninhabited areas, and 550,000 of them were Northerners. The second half (1981–1985) saw almost 1 million Northerners relocated to the New Economic Zones. Government and military personnel from Northern and North-Central Vietnam are also posted to various locations throughout the country that were often away from their home regions. More recently, the growth of the free market system has resulted in increased interregional movement and relations between distant parts of Vietnam through business and travel. The movements have also resulted in some blending of dialects and more significantly have made the Northern dialect more easily understood in the South and vice versa. Most Southerners, when singing modern/old popular Vietnamese songs or addressing the public, do so in the standardized accent if possible, which uses the Northern pronunciation. That is true in both Vietnam and overseas Vietnamese communities.

Modern Standard Vietnamese is based on the Hanoi dialect. Nevertheless, the major dialects are still predominant in their respective areas and have also evolved over time with influences from other areas. Historically, accents have been distinguished by how each region pronounces the letters d ([z] in the Northern dialect and [j] in the Central and Southern dialect) and r ([z] in the Northern dialect and [r] in the Central and Southern dialects). Thus, the Central and the Southern dialects can be said to have retained a pronunciation closer to Vietnamese orthography and resemble how Middle Vietnamese sounded, in contrast to the modern Northern (Hanoi) dialect, which has since undergone pronunciation shifts.

Vocabulary

Although regional variations developed over time, most of those words can be used interchangeably and be understood well, albeit with more or less frequency then others or with slightly different but often discernible word choices and pronunciations. Some accents may mix, with words such dạ vâng combining dạ and vâng, being created.

Consonants
The syllable-initial ch and tr digraphs are pronounced distinctly in the North-Central, Central, and Southern varieties but are merged in Northern varieties, which pronounce them the same way). Many North-Central varieties preserve three distinct pronunciations for d, gi, and r, but the Northern varieties have a three-way merger, and the Central and the Southern varieties have a merger of d and gi but keep r distinct. At the end of syllables, the palatals ch and nh have merged with the alveolars t and n, which, in turn, have also partially merged with velars c and ng in the Central and the Southern varieties.

In addition to the regional variation described above, there is a merger of l and n in certain rural varieties in the North:

Variation between l and n can be found even in mainstream Vietnamese in certain words. In some northern varieties, the numeral appears with an initial nh instead of l:  "twenty-five", instead of the mainstream .

There is also a merger of r and g in certain rural varieties in the South:

The consonant clusters that were originally present in Middle Vietnamese (in the 17th century) have been lost in almost all modern Vietnamese varieties although they have been retained in other closely-related Vietic languages.

Tones
Although there are six tones in Vietnamese, some tones may slightly merge but are still highly distinguishable from the context of the speech. The hỏi and ngã tones are distinct in North and some North-Central varieties (although often with different pitch contours) but have somewhat  merged in the Central, Southern, and some North-Central varieties (also with different pitch contours). Some North-Central varieties (such as  Vietnamese) have a slight merger of the ngã and nặng tones but keep the hỏi tone distinct. Still, other North-Central varieties have a three-way merger of hỏi, ngã, and nặng and so have a four-tone system. In addition, there are several phonetic differences (mostly in pitch contour and phonation type) in the tones among the dialects.

(See also the tone section below.)

Word play
A basic form of word play in Vietnamese involves disyllabic words in which the last syllable forms the first syllable of the next word in the chain. This game involves two members versing each other until the opponent is unable to think of another word. For instance: 

Another language game known as nói lái is used by Vietnamese speakers. Nói lái involves switching, adding or removing the tones in a pair of words and may also involve switching the order of words or the first consonant and the rime of each word. Some examples:

{| class="wikitable"
! Original phrase !! !! Phrase after nói lái transformation !! Structural change
|-
| đái dầm "(child) pee" || → || dấm đài (literal translation "vinegar stage") || word order and tone switch
|-
| chửa hoang "pregnancy out of wedlock" || → || hoảng chưa "scared yet?" || word order and tone switch
|-
| bầy tôi "all the king's subjects" || → || bồi tây "west waiter" || initial consonant, rime, and tone switch
|-
| bí mật "secrets" || → || bật mí "reveal" || initial consonant and rime switch
|-
| Tây Ban Nha "Spain (España)" || → || Tây Bán Nhà (literal translation "Westerner selling home") || initial consonant, rime, and tone switch
|}

The resulting transformed phrase often has a different meaning but sometimes may just be a nonsensical word pair. Nói lái can be used to obscure the original meaning and thus soften the discussion of a socially sensitive issue, as with dấm đài and hoảng chưa (above), or when implied (and not overtly spoken), to deliver a hidden subtextual message, as with bồi tây. Naturally, nói lái can be used for a humorous effect.

Another word game somewhat reminiscent of pig latin is played by children. Here a nonsense syllable (chosen by the child) is prefixed onto a target word's syllables, then their initial consonants and rimes are switched with the tone of the original word remaining on the new switched rime.

{| class="wikitable"
! Nonsense syllable !! Target word !! !! Intermediate form with prefixed syllable !! !! Resulting "secret" word
|-
| la || phở "beef or chicken noodle soup" || → || la phở || → || lơ phả
|-
| la || ăn "to eat" || → || la ăn || → || lăn a
|-
| la || hoàn cảnh "situation" || → || la hoàn la cảnh || → || loan hà lanh cả
|-
| chim || hoàn cảnh "situation" || → || chim hoàn chim cảnh || → || choan hìm chanh kỉm
|}

This language game is often used as a "secret" or "coded" language useful for obscuring messages from adult comprehension.

See also

 Vietnamese Wikipedia
Vietnamese calligraphy
Vietnamese pronouns
 Vietnamese studies

Notes

References

Bibliography

General
 Dương, Quảng-Hàm. (1941). Việt-nam văn-học sử-yếu [Outline history of Vietnamese literature]. Saigon: Bộ Quốc gia Giáo dục.
 
 
 
 
 
 
 
 
 
 Uỷ ban Khoa học Xã hội Việt Nam. (1983). Ngữ-pháp tiếng Việt [Vietnamese grammar]. Hanoi: Khoa học Xã hội.

Sound system

Language variation
 Alves, Mark J. 2007. "A Look At North-Central Vietnamese" In SEALS XII Papers from the 12th Annual Meeting of the Southeast Asian Linguistics Society 2002, edited by Ratree Wayland et al. Canberra, Australia, 1–7. Pacific Linguistics, Research School of Pacific and Asian Studies, The Australian National University
 Alves, Mark J.; & Nguyễn, Duy Hương. (2007). "Notes on Thanh-Chương Vietnamese in Nghệ-An province". In M. Alves, M. Sidwell, & D. Gil (Eds.), SEALS VIII: Papers from the 8th annual meeting of the Southeast Asian Linguistics Society 1998 (pp. 1–9). Canberra: Pacific Linguistics, The Australian National University, Research School of Pacific and Asian Studies
 
 Honda, Koichi. (2006). "F0 and phonation types in Nghe Tinh Vietnamese tones". In P. Warren & C. I. Watson (Eds.), Proceedings of the 11th Australasian International Conference on Speech Science and Technology (pp. 454–459). Auckland, New Zealand: University of Auckland.
 Machaud, Alexis; Ferlus, Michel; & Nguyễn, Minh-Châu. (2015). "Strata of standardization: the Phong Nha dialect of Vietnamese (Quảng Bình Province) in historical perspective". Linguistics of the Tibeto-Burman Area, Dept. of Linguistics, University of California, 2015, 38 (1), pp. 124–162.
 Pham, Andrea Hoa. (2005). "Vietnamese tonal system in Nghi Loc: A preliminary report". In C. Frigeni, M. Hirayama, & S. Mackenzie (Eds.), Toronto working papers in linguistics: Special issue on similarity in phonology (Vol. 24, pp. 183–459). Auckland, New Zealand: University of Auckland.
 Vũ, Thanh Phương. (1982). "Phonetic properties of Vietnamese tones across dialects". In D. Bradley (Ed.), Papers in Southeast Asian linguistics: Tonation (Vol. 8, pp. 55–75). Sydney: Pacific Linguistics, The Australian National University.
 Vương, Hữu Lễ. (1981). "Vài nhận xét về đặc diểm của vần trong thổ âm Quảng Nam ở Hội An" [Some notes on special qualities of the rhyme in local Quảng Nam speech in Hội An]. In Một Số Vấn Ðề Ngôn Ngữ Học Việt Nam [Some linguistics issues in Vietnam] (pp. 311–320). Hà Nội: Nhà Xuất Bản Ðại Học và Trung Học Chuyên Nghiệp.

Pragmatics
 Luong, Hy Van. (1987). "Plural markers and personal pronouns in Vietnamese person reference: An analysis of pragmatic ambiguity and negative models". Anthropological Linguistics, 29(1), 49–70.

Historical and comparative
 
 
 Cooke, Joseph R. (1968). Pronominal reference in Thai, Burmese, and Vietnamese. University of California publications in linguistics (No. 52). Berkeley: University of California Press.
  
 
 Gregerson, Kenneth J. (1969). "A study of Middle Vietnamese phonology". Bulletin de la Société des Études Indochinoises, 44, 135–193. (Reprinted in 1981).
 
 
 
 
 Shorto, Harry L. edited by Sidwell, Paul, Cooper, Doug and Bauer, Christian (2006). A Mon–Khmer comparative dictionary. Canberra: Australian National University. Pacific Linguistics. ISBN

Orthography
 

 English translation: 
 Nguyễn, Đình-Hoà. (1955). Quốc-ngữ: The modern writing system in Vietnam. Washington, DC: Author.
 
 Nguyễn, Đình-Hoà. (1996). Vietnamese. In P. T. Daniels, & W. Bright (Eds.), The world's writing systems, (pp. 691–699). New York: Oxford University Press. .

Pedagogical
 Nguyen, Bich Thuan. (1997). Contemporary Vietnamese: An intermediate text. Southeast Asian language series. Northern Illinois University, Center for Southeast Asian Studies.
 Healy, Dana. (2004). Teach Yourself Vietnamese. Teach Yourself. Chicago: McGraw-Hill. ISBN
 Hoang, Thinh; Nguyen, Xuan Thu; Trinh, Quynh-Tram; (2000). Vietnamese phrasebook, (3rd ed.). Hawthorn, Vic.: Lonely Planet. ISBN
 Moore, John. (1994). Colloquial Vietnamese: A complete language course. London: Routledge.
 Nguyễn, Đình-Hoà. (1967). Read Vietnamese: A graded course in written Vietnamese. Rutland, Vermont: C.E. Tuttle.
 Lâm, Lý-duc; Emeneau, M. B.; von den Steinen, Diether. (1944). An Annamese reader. Berkeley: University of California, Berkeley.
 Nguyễn, Đăng Liêm. (1970). Vietnamese pronunciation. PALI language texts: Southeast Asia. Honolulu: University of Hawaii Press.

External links 

 Online lessons
 Online Vietnamese lessons from Northern Illinois University

 Vocabulary

 Vietnamese Vocabulary List (from the World Loanword Database)
 Swadesh list of Vietnamese basic vocabulary words (from Wiktionary's Swadesh-list appendix)

 Language tools
 The Vietnamese keyboard its layout is compared with US, UK, Canada, France, and Germany's keyboards.
 The Free Vietnamese Dictionary Project
Research projects and data resources
 rwaai | Projects RWAAI (Repository and Workspace for Austroasiatic Intangible Heritage)
 http://hdl.handle.net/10050/00-0000-0000-0003-93ED-5@view Vietnamese in RWAAI Digital Archive

 
Analytic languages
Isolating languages
Languages of Vietnam
Languages of Cambodia
Languages of China
Languages of the Czech Republic
Subject–verb–object languages
Vietic languages
Tonal languages in non-tonal families